Athena Arms the Warrior (German: Athena bewaffnet den Krieger) is an 1851 sculpture by Karl Heinrich Möller, installed on Schlossbrücke in Berlin, Germany.

See also

 1851 in art
 Greek mythology in popular culture

References

External links
 

1851 establishments in Germany
1851 sculptures
Ancient Greece in art and culture
Outdoor sculptures in Berlin
Sculptures of men in Germany
Sculptures of Athena
Statues in Germany